Holstebro Idrætspark is a multi-use stadium in Holstebro, Denmark. It is currently used mostly for association football  matches and is the home stadium of Holstebro Boldklub.  The stadium holds 8,000 people.

References

External links
 Public service homepage

Football venues in Denmark
Buildings and structures in the Central Denmark Region
Holstebro